Chamera II is a run of the river hydroelectric dam built by NHPC India. It is a 300 MW (3x100 MW) project built on the Ravi River  in Himachal Pradesh. It was commissioned in March 2004.

References

External links

NHPC India website

Dams in Himachal Pradesh
Hydroelectric power stations in Himachal Pradesh
Dams completed in 2004
Dams on the Ravi River
Buildings and structures in Chamba district
2004 establishments in Himachal Pradesh
Energy infrastructure completed in 2004